Kumite (literally "grappling hands") is one of the three main sections of karate training, along with kata and kihon. Kumite is the part of karate in which a person trains against an adversary.

Kumite can be used to develop a particular technique or a skill (e.g. effectively judging and adjusting one's distance from one's opponent) or it can be done in competition.

Types
Since the word "kumite" refers to forms of sparring, it covers a vast range of activities. In traditional Shotokan karate, the first type of kumite for beginners is gohon kumite. The defender steps back each time, blocking the attacks and performing a counterattack after the last block. This activity looks nothing like the jiyu kumite (or "free sparring") practiced by more advanced practitioners.

Types:
 Ippon kumite - one step sparring, typically used for self-defense drills
 Sanbon kumite - three-step sparring, typically used to develop speed, strength, and technique
 Gohon kumite - five-step sparring, pre-arranged attack and counter exercises
 Kiso kumite - structured sparring drawn from a kata
 Jiyu kumite - free sparring
 Jiyu ippon kumite - one step semi-free sparring
Iri Kumi - free sparring in Okinawan dialect, used in Gōjū-Ryū
Jiyu Kobo - old version of Jiyu Kumite in Uechi-Ryū used by Uechi Kanbun's Wakayama dojo

Delivering strikes
Many schools feel it is important that karateka "pull their punches". Karate training is designed to give its practitioners the ability to deliver devastating power through techniques like punches and kicks. Often the aim of training is that each single strike should be enough to subdue the opponent. However, this clearly would make it difficult to train due to the possibility of injury. Many beginners, while sparring, will be instructed to develop control and accuracy first, then speed and power later. In doing this, it may seem like the student is pulling his punches, when actually, he is developing technique first. For injury purposes, certain targets are discouraged, like strikes to the knee and face contact for low ranks. Many schools prohibit strikes to the groin, while others allow it completely. Some schools might limit contact to light contact all around, while others may employ power usage at higher grades.

All types of sparring allow the martial artist to develop both control and experience in delivering powerful strikes against an opponent. In full contact karate, punches are often "pulled" to some slight extent in training, to minimize the occurrence of injuries that would interrupt practice. However, some karate schools use protective gear in free sparring, so that strikes can be delivered closer to their full power. Most karate clubs and most styles of karate combine some controlled full-contact sparring and some sparring with protective gear (from gloves to feet pads and up to full head and even chest guards such as in taekwondo). 

However, a few more traditional clubs that never use protective gear for sparring (except groin and mouth guards that protect against accidental injuries) argue that a karateka will not be able to make their most powerful strike when sparring in the dojo (against a friend whom they no doubt do not want to injure) even if this opponent is wearing protective clothing. Therefore, the karateka will still be using some level of control, as is obviously necessary, and cannot truly capture the spirit of one lethal strike whilst sparring. Except for a life or death self-defense situation, the spirit and power of the single lethal strike can only be achieved when a karateka does not have to avoid injuring their training partner. The traditionalists therefore argue that there is no benefit to sparring with more forceful strikes.

However, in Kyokushin Karate no padding is used and fighters don't "pull their punches" as fights are finished by knockdown.

Competition

In some forms of competition kumite, punching ("tsuki") and kicking ("keri") techniques are allowed at the head ("jodan") and abdomen ("chudan"). In some tournaments, face contact is allowed, sometimes limited to senior practitioners. One example of a scoring system is that the first competitor to take eight points in three minutes wins the bout.

Kumite is an essential part of karate training, and free sparring is often experienced as exciting, because both opponents have to react and adapt to each other very quickly.

In tournaments kumite often takes place inside of a 'ringed' area similar to that of a boxing ring. If a karateka steps out of the ring, they are given a warning. If they step out of the ring two times, the other person gains a point. Many international tournaments use a "point sparring" form of kumite that requires control ('pulling punches') and therefore warnings can be dealt for excessive force on techniques to the head, or sensitive areas. Full contact is permitted to the torso area of the body only. Some tournament rules allow for light contact to the head, whereas other rules do not allow this.

Kumite also includes a series of guidelines that, if followed correctly, result in a clean and safe fight. These are some of those guidelines:

A karateka must remain in some form of proper fighting stance and in the "kamae-te" position (hands up, ready to fight position)
A karateka must be aware of all obstacles around him/her
A karateka must never deliberately endanger themselves by turning their back to their opponent
A practiced and well trained karateka must concentrate on stance and footwork

For the last point about stance and footwork: it is often taught that a karateka who wishes to be fast and agile while competing in kumite should always be 'pulsing'. Pulsing is where the karateka remains almost bouncing on the balls of their feet to maintain minimal frictional contact with the ground, allowing them to move quickly.

Another aspect of kumite which is often seen in international tournaments, as well as many local competitions is what is referred to as clashing. Clashing is where both opponents throw techniques against each other at the same time, often resulting in both getting hit with the techniques. This creates a problem for referees as they are unable to make out which technique was quick, on target and recoiled - all the things that constitute a clean technique that is scored. Because of clashing, most modern day karateka are taught to practice kumite in a 'one for one' situation where one attacks, then the other attacks and so on. However, due to the speed of these techniques, and the speed of the footwork of each karateka, to the casual observer it may appear that they are still clashing when in fact they are not. When opponents are considered to be clashing, the head referee should declare "aiuchi" which means "simultaneous hit".  When a winner is decided, the referee will announce "~ no kachi" which means "~'s win".

The tournament rules of full contact or "knockdown" styles of karate often don't award any points for controlled techniques delivered to the opponent. In fact, they usually don't award points for full-force techniques delivered to the opponent either. Instead, points are only awarded for knocking, sweeping, or throwing your opponent to the floor. Kyokushinkai and its "offshoot" karate organizations are the styles usually known to promote knockdown tournament rules.  They believe this type of tournament competition is closer to "real life" personal combat, although still in a tournament setting with rules.

There are three criticisms to date. First, is the quickness versus skill argument.  The tournament fighter learns how to shoot in quickly but deliver an unimpressive strike that gains him or her a point.  Also, the question of discoloration of face due to contact, which can allow for disqualification.  It is often difficult to gauge the true intensity of the attack, so this could cause questioning.  Last, it is seen as sport and sport alone.  Traditionalists may dismiss it as "useless", but modern dojos often band with other dojos to form organizations that utilize a tournament circuit as a way to promote their dojos.

Points
Most high school karate associations use the following point scheme:

 1 point: punching to chest and stomach.
 2 points: back slap kick.
 3 points: face slap kick.

International competition under the World Karate Federation also includes the following point scoring:

 2 points: punching or kicking the adversary's back.
 3 points: for a sweep/takedown with a follow up technique such as a stomp or a punch. (Any sweep/takedown that is not followed up with a technique may be ruled to be a dangerous technique that can result in a warning against the instigator of that sweep/takedown.)

See also

Karate Combat
Karate at the Summer Olympics
Karate World Championships
100-man kumite
Bloodsport

References

Karate
Japanese martial arts